Adolfo Díaz (born 12 November 1924) was an Argentine wrestler. He competed in two events at the 1956 Summer Olympics.

References

External links
 

1924 births
Possibly living people
Argentine male sport wrestlers
Olympic wrestlers of Argentina
Wrestlers at the 1956 Summer Olympics
Place of birth missing
Wrestlers at the 1951 Pan American Games
Pan American Games silver medalists for Argentina
Pan American Games medalists in wrestling
Medalists at the 1951 Pan American Games